Dance Suite, Sz. 77, BB 86a, is a well-known 1923 orchestral work by the Hungarian composer Béla Bartók. The composer produced a reduction for piano (Sz. 77, BB 86b) in 1925, though this is less commonly performed.

Composition 

Béla Bartók composed the Dance Suite in 1923 in order to celebrate the 50th anniversary of the union of the cities Buda and Pest, to form the Hungarian capital Budapest. Then, after its great success, the director of Universal Edition, Emil Hertzka, commissioned from him an arrangement for piano, which was published in 1925. However, he never publicly performed this arrangement, and it was premiered in March 1945, a few months before his death, by his friend György Sándor.

Structure 

This suite has six movements, even though some recordings conceive it as one single full-length movement. A typical performance of the whole work would last approximately fifteen minutes.

This work consists of five dances with Arabic, Wallachian and Hungarian melodies, and a finale that brings together all the previous thematic sketches. There was one more movement, omitted by the composer according to his mathematical principles, which would be placed between the second and the third movement. This movement is called Slovakian Dance, and was finally dismissed and remained unorchestrated. However, the first, second and fourth movements contain thematic references to this piece towards the end of each one of them.

Recordings 

Notable recordings of the orchestral version include:

Notable recordings of the piano reduction include:

References

External links 
 

Suites by Béla Bartók
1923 compositions
1925 compositions
Compositions for symphony orchestra
Compositions for solo piano
Orchestral suites